Laubuka is a genus of cyprinid fish found in South and Southeast Asia.

Species
There are currently 14 recognized species in this genus:
 Laubuka brahmaputraensis Kulabtong, Suksri & Nonpayom, 2012 
 Laubuka caeruleostigmata H. M. Smith, 1931 (Leaping barb)
 Laubuka dadiburjori Menon, 1952 (Dadio)
 Laubuka fasciata (Silas, 1958)
 Laubuka hema Sudasinghe, Pethiyagoda & Meegaskumbura, 2020 
 Laubuka insularis Pethiyagoda, Kottelat, Anjana Silva, Maduwage & Meegaskumbura, 2008
 Laubuka lankensis (Deraniyagala, 1960)
 Laubuka latens Knight, 2015   
 Laubuka laubuca (F. Hamilton, 1822) (Indian glass barb)
 Laubuka ruhuna Pethiyagoda, Kottelat, Anjana Silva, Maduwage & Meegaskumbura, 2008
 Laubuka siamensis Fowler, 1939
 Laubuka tenella Kullander, Rahman, Norén, Mollah, 2018 
 Laubuka trevori Knight, 2015 
 Laubuka varuna Pethiyagoda, Kottelat, Anjana Silva, Maduwage & Meegaskumbura, 2008

References

 
Fish of Asia
Cyprinidae genera